Royal Air Force Harrowbeer or more simply RAF Harrowbeer is a former Royal Air Force station situated next to Yelverton in the parish of Buckland Monachorum, Devon, England

Location
Roborough Rock is a tor-like igneous rock outcrop immediately south-west of the airfield (officially called 'Udal Tor') on Roborough Down, next to the border with the A386. This location created problems for the airfield during the Second World War, mainly due to bad weather. The Rock seems to have had little impact on the use of the Airfield, the only thing that was done by the RAF was the placing of a warning light on the top. There seems to be no truth in the widely-held belief that the RAF attempted to blow it up.

Although sited near the village of Yelverton, it was called 'Harrowbeer' in order to distinguish it from the similar-sounding RNAS Yeovilton which had recently changed its name from HMS Heron when the Airfield opened on 15 August 1941. The airfield was under the control of No. 10 Group RAF and was never assigned a station badge.

The former Ravenscroft School became the officers' mess.

Canadian pilot Jack Brown, of 193 Squadron, recounts his first training flight in the relatively new, and daunting, Hawker Typhoon fighter-bomber at Harrowbeer:

"We were understandably in awe of the Tiffie's size and power. We had been warned of the violent effect of torque . . . which caused a swing to the right on takeoff  . . On takeoff, I locked my left leg rigidly on the rudder bar . . . I got off safely . . [but] At times I felt as if the machine was flying me!  . . . [on landing] To make sure I didn't stall it, I came in with a little too much speed. The runways at Harrowbeer were not exceptionally long and I could see a pile of bricks at the end coming up fast. Luckily, the brakes held and the machine stopped in time."
Once 193 Squadron became operational at Harrowbeer, they began patrolling the coast to intercept low level attacks by Focke Wulf Fw 190 fighter-bombers.  The Typhoon patrols against the 190s

". . . were carried out by pairs of aircraft; one right down on the water, the other about a hundred feet up. Several fellows bent the ends of their props when they flew too low and actually touched the sea. We did standby duty, waiting at the end of the runway, ready to take off as soon as a Very pistol was fired from the control tower."

Later, the Typhoon pilots at Harrowbeer also launched attacks on shipping targets on the French coast, the first target being Brest.

Based units
The airfield opened in May 1941. It closed following the end of the Second World War.

A large number of units used the airfield at some point, such as:

Other units
 No. 19 Group Communications Flight
 No. 78 (Signals) Wing Calibration Flight RAF
 No. 82 Gliding School RAF
 No. 156 (General Reconnaissance) Wing RAF
 Force 135 (RAF Element)
 No. 229 Maintenance Unit RAF
 No. 401 Air Stores Park
 No. 2738 Squadron RAF Regiment
 No. 2847 Squadron RAF Regiment
 No. 2883 Squadron RAF Regiment
 No. 2891 Squadron RAF Regiment

References

Citations

Bibliography

External links

 Dedicated website

Royal Air Force stations in Devon